Microdrosophila quadrata is a species of vinegar flies, insects in the family Drosophilidae.

References

Drosophilidae
Articles created by Qbugbot
Insects described in 1916